Valea may refer to several places in Romania:

 Valea, a village in Urmeniș Commune, Bistrița-Năsăud County
 Valea, a village in Pietrari Commune, Dâmbovița County
 Valea, a village in Bolboși Commune, Gorj County
 Valea, a village in Zam Commune, Hunedoara County
 Valea, a village in Vărgata Commune, Mureș County

and to a place in Moldova:
 Valea, a village in Cremenciug Commune, Soroca district
 Valea-Trestieni, a commune in Nisporeni district

and to a place in Ukraine:

 Valea, the Romanian name for Valy village, Karapchiv, Vyzhnytsia Raion, Chernivtsi Oblast

and to:

 Valea Pepelo

See also 
 Vale (disambiguation)

 Valea Albă (disambiguation)
 Valea Borcutului (disambiguation)
 Valea Largă (disambiguation)
 Valea Lungă (disambiguation)
 Valea Lupului (disambiguation)
 Valea Mare (disambiguation)
 Valea Perjei (disambiguation)
 Valea Rece (disambiguation)
 Valea Seacă (disambiguation)
 Valea Satului (disambiguation)
 Valea Ursului (disambiguation)
 Valea Verde (disambiguation)
 Valea Viei (disambiguation)
 Valea Vinului (disambiguation)

 Văleni (disambiguation)
 Vălișoara (disambiguation)